QTSS may refer to:

Queenstown Secondary School, a secondary school in Queenstown, Singapore
QuickTime Streaming Server, a server that was built into Apple's Mac OS X Server until OS X Server 10.6.8